Bubuashi is a town in the Greater Accra Region of Ghana.

References

Populated places in the Greater Accra Region